Salinihabitans is a Gram-negative, rod-shaped and non-motile genus of bacteria from the family of Rhodobacteraceae with one known species (Salinihabitans flavidus). Salinihabitans flavidus has been isolated from a marine solar saltern from Korea.

References

Rhodobacteraceae
Bacteria genera
Monotypic bacteria genera